Huk (also Romanized as Hūk) is a village in Kuh Yakhab Rural District, Dastgerdan District, Tabas County, South Khorasan Province, Iran. At the 2006 census, its population was 75, in 22 families.

References 

Populated places in Tabas County